Mark of the Legion is the fourth studio release by the American brutal death metal band Deeds of Flesh. It was released in 2001.

Track listing

Personnel

Musicians
Jacoby Kingston - Bass, vocals
Erik Lindmark - Guitar, vocals
Mike Hamilton - Drums

Production
Recorded at Moon Productions
Produced by Deeds of Flesh
Thomas E. Gingell - Engineer

External links
 
 MySpace Profile

 

Deeds of Flesh albums
2001 albums